Mulagapudi is a village in Rowthulapudi Mandal, Kakinada district in the state of Andhra Pradesh in India.

Geography 

Demographics 
Mulagapudi Village has a population of 4600, out of which 2371 are male and 2229 are female. Population of children below 6 years of age are 456. The literacy rate of the village is 51.64%.

References 

Villages in Rowthulapudi mandal